Thomas Frederick de Pledge (1867–1954) was an Australian pioneer and pastoralist.

The son of Reverend Joseph De Pledge, he was born in Durham in 1867. Educated at Aldenham in Hertfordshire, he left for Australia at age 18 aboard the Australind and disembarked at Fremantle. He set of for Bunbury and worked on a farm for less than a year then left for the Ashburton region. Working on a Minderoo Station for seven years for David Forrest and Septimus Burt he later moved to Globe Hill Station to work for McCrae and Harper, first of an overseer and then as a manager.

In 1897 de Pledge was appointed as manager at Yanrey Station by the estate of John Stuart. In 1909 he also acquired Globe Hill and incorporated it into Yanrey.

Frederick Bedford and De Pledge acquired Globe Hill Station in 1909 for £35,000.

De Pledge died in 1954 at age 87, leaving a widow and two daughters.

References

1867 births
1954 deaths
Australian pastoralists
People from Durham, England
People from the Pilbara
English emigrants to Australia